Tanguy de Lamotte is a French sailor born on 6 May 1978 in Versailles, Yvelines. He is a Naval Architect by training, having studied Yacht and Powercraft Design at Southampton Solent University in the UK.

Sailing results

Gallery

References

External links
 Official Facebook Page

1978 births
Living people
People from Versailles
French male sailors (sport)
Sportspeople from Versailles, Yvelines
Alumni of Solent University
IMOCA 60 class sailors
French Vendee Globe sailors
2012 Vendee Globe sailors
2016 Vendee Globe sailors
Vendée Globe finishers
Single-handed circumnavigating sailors
Class 40 class sailors
Class 40 class world champions
World champions in sailing for France